Hehl is a surname. Notable people with the surname include:

Jake Hehl (1899–1961), American baseball player
Lambert Hehl (born 1924), American politician
Maximilian Emil Hehl (1861–1916), Brazil-based German engineer and architect
Ulrich von Hehl (born 1947), German historian